"There's a Silver Moon on the Golden Gate" is the official song commemorating the opening the Golden Gate Bridge in May 1937.  It was written by Charles Tobias, Bob Rothberg and Joseph Meyer.  Music publishers, Irving Berlin Inc.

The song was first recorded on December 1, 1936, by George Hall and His Hotel Taft Orchestra.

References

1937 songs
Songs written by Joseph Meyer (songwriter)
Songs written by Bob Rothberg
Songs written by Charles Tobias